The Desperate Man is a 1959 British B movie crime film directed by Peter Maxwell and starring Conrad Phillips, Jill Ireland, William Hartnell, Charles Gray and Peter Swanwick. The plot involves a writer who investigates a murder in the tower of a castle. It is adapted from the 1958 novel Beginner's Luck by Paul Somers, the writer better known as Andrew Garve.

In the US, the feature was shown as an episode of Kraft Mystery Theater in 1961.

Plot
Two reporters, Curtis (Conrad Phillips) and his girlfriend Carol (Jill Ireland), pursue jewel thief Smith (William Hartnell) through the Sussex countryside. On arriving at an ancient castle, Smith abducts Carol and holds her hostage, and Curtis is forced to assist the thief to find his buried loot.

Cast
 Conrad Phillips as Curtis
 Jill Ireland as Carol Bourne
 William Hartnell as Smith
 Charles Gray as Lawson
 Peter Swanwick as Hoad
 Arthur Gomez as Landlord
 John Warwick as Inspector Cobley
 Patricia Burke as Miss Prew
 Ernest Butcher as Grocer

References

External links
 

1959 films
1959 crime films
British black-and-white films
Films based on British novels
British crime films
1950s English-language films
Films directed by Peter Maxwell
1950s British films